V602 Carinae (V602 Car, HD 97671) is a red supergiant and variable star of spectral type of M3 in the constellation Carina. It is one of largest known stars.

A 2015 study derived a slightly higher bolometric luminosity of  based on the measured flux and an assumed distance, and a larger radius of  based on the measured angular diameter and luminosity.

An excess of emission at long wavelengths from this star, as well as a small amount of silicate emission, suggests that it may be enclosed by an extensive cloud of dust.

V602 Car is a semiregular variable star with a maximum brightness range of magnitude 7.6 - 9.1 and a period of 635 or 672 days.  Despite the large amplitude of variation, it was only named as a variable star in 2006.

See also
 RT Carinae
 EV Carinae

References

M-type supergiants
Carina (constellation)
Carinae, V602
097671
Semiregular variable stars
CD-59 3623
J11132996-6005288
IRAS catalogue objects